{{Infobox person
| name               = Joaquim Dos Santos
| image              = Joaquim Dos Santos by Gage Skidmore.jpg
| caption            = Dos Santos in 2012
| birth_name         = 
| birth_date         = 
| birth_place        = Lisbon, Portugal
| nationality        = American
| education          = 
| occupation         = Storyboard artist, director, producer, writer, designer
| notable_works      = Justice League UnlimitedAvatar: The Last AirbenderG.I. Joe: ResoluteThe Legend of KorraVoltron: Legendary DefenderSpider-Man: Across the Spider-Verse
| yearsactive        = 
| spouse             = 
| relatives          = 
| website            = 
}}
Joaquim Dos Santos is a Portuguese-born American storyboard artist, director, producer, writer, and designer. He is best known for his directing work on the television series Justice League Unlimited, Avatar: The Last Airbender, G.I. Joe: Resolute, The Legend of Korra, and Voltron: Legendary Defender. He also serves as a co-director on the films Spider-Man: Across the Spider-Verse (2023) and Spider-Man: Beyond the Spider-Verse (2024).

 Career 
He was a storyboard artist for the animated series Justice League before being promoted in the show's renamed third season. He went on to direct half of the episodes of Justice League Unlimited alongside fellow DC Animated Universe director Dan Riba, including the final episode "Destroyer". He joined the staff of Avatar: The Last Airbender in the middle of the show's second season as a storyboard artist, and began directing episodes in the third season, including the last two parts of the four-part series finale. He would later go on to work on Avatar's sequel series The Legend of Korra, as he co-directed all of the first season alongside Ki Hyun Ryu and served as co-executive producer for the entire series.

He also served as supervising director on the mini-series G.I. Joe: Resolute. After that project, he moved back to Warner Bros. Animation, where he directed two DC Showcase short films: The Spectre (accompanying the Justice League: Crisis on Two Earths direct-to-video movie) and Jonah Hex (on Batman: Under the Red Hood). He also worked as an executive producer and co-showrunner on the animated series Voltron: Legendary Defender with Lauren Montgomery. He is attached to direct Spider-Man: Across the Spider-Verse and Spider-Man: Beyond the Spider-Verse'', alongside Kemp Powers and Justin K. Thompson.

References

External links 

Joaquim Dos Santos at DeviantArt
Joaquim Dos Santos' blog
Interview with Joaquim Dos Santos about his work on Avatar: The Last Airbender
More information about G.I. Joe: Resolute

1977 births
American art directors
American storyboard artists
American television directors
American television producers
Background artists
Living people
DreamWorks Animation people
Nickelodeon Animation Studio people
Portuguese emigrants to the United States
Sony Pictures Animation people